Leucopogon blakei  is a species of flowering plant in the heath family Ericaceae and is endemic to inland southern Queensland. It is a sometimes prostrate, twiggy shrub with hairy branches, egg-shaped leaves with the narrower end towards the base, and small white flowers.

Description
The leaves are slightly concave, slightly turned downwards and slightly softly-hairy on the lower surface.

Taxonomy
Leucopogon blakei was first formally described in 1990 by Leslie Pedley in the journal Austrobaileya from specimens collected in the Carnarvon Range by Clifford Gittins in 1960. The specific epithet (blakei) honours Stanley Thatcher Blake.

Distribution and habitat
This leucopogon grows on shallow sandy soil in inland southern Queensland.

References

blakei
Ericales of Australia
Flora of Queensland
Plants described in 1990